The UCI Track Cycling World Championships – Men's 1 km Time Trial is the world championship track cycling time trial event for men, held annually at the UCI Track Cycling World Championships. Arnaud Tournant and François Pervis of France, Chris Hoy of Great Britain and Stefan Nimke of Germany share the record of most wins with four each.

The event was also held at the Summer Olympics from 1928. However, after it was removed from the 2008 Summer Olympics cycling programme, some cyclists, such as Hoy, decided to concentrate on other events instead.

The event was first held at the world championships in 1966, until 1993 it was an amateurs race.

Medalists

Medal table

External links
Track Cycling World Championships 2016–1893 bikecult.com
World Championship, Track, 1km, Elite cyclingarchives.com

 
Men's 1 km time trial
Lists of UCI Track Cycling World Championships medalists